Manuel Fernández Muñiz (born 9 May 1986), commonly known as Manu, is a Spanish former professional footballer who played as a goalkeeper.

Club career
Born in Gijón, Asturias, and a product of Mareo, Sporting de Gijón's youth academy, Manu made his professional debut during the 2005–06 season, with the club in the Segunda División. In 2007 he joined Deportivo de La Coruña, spending the better part of his first two years with the reserves.

In the 2009–10 campaign, after Gustavo Munúa's departure to Málaga CF, Manu was promoted to Dani Aranzubia's backup. On 23 March 2010, after the latter was sent off against precisely Sporting Gijón (Depor eventually finished with nine players) at the 10-minute mark, he made his La Liga debut, in a 2–1 away loss.

Due to injury to Aranzubia, Manu started 2010–11's first six games then returned to the bench, appearing in the Copa del Rey as Deportivo were eventually relegated after 20 years. In July he signed with another team in the second division, Recreativo de Huelva, and continued competing at that level the following years, in representation of AD Alcorcón and Deportivo Alavés.

Manu returned to the Estadio Riazor for the 2015–16 season, arriving following injury to habitual starter Fabri. Again, he played second-fiddle, now to Germán Lux.

In the summer of 2016, Manu signed with Iranian club Machine Sazi FC, newly promoted to the Persian Gulf Pro League, on a one-year contract. He returned to Spain halfway through the campaign, joining Marbella FC from Segunda División B.

Honours
Spain U19
UEFA European Under-19 Championship: 2004

References

External links

1986 births
Living people
Spanish footballers
Footballers from Gijón
Association football goalkeepers
La Liga players
Segunda División players
Segunda División B players
Tercera División players
Sporting de Gijón B players
Sporting de Gijón players
Deportivo Fabril players
Deportivo de La Coruña players
Recreativo de Huelva players
AD Alcorcón footballers
Deportivo Alavés players
Marbella FC players
Persian Gulf Pro League players
Machine Sazi F.C. players
Spain youth international footballers
Spanish expatriate footballers
Expatriate footballers in Iran
Spanish expatriate sportspeople in Iran